The 2021–22 Copa Conecta was the 1st edition of the Copa Conecta, a knockout competition for Mexican football clubs from Liga Premier and Liga TDP.

The Copa Conecta is an official Mexican tournament that was created in 2021 with the aim of providing a greater opportunity for development to the soccer players of the Premier and TDP league teams.

Qualified teams

Teams classified in position 5 to 8 of groups 1 and 2 of Serie A and Serie B at Torneo Apertura 2021.
 Ciervos (Serie B)
 Colima (Serie A – Group 1)
 Gavilanes de Matamoros (Serie A – Group 1)
 Guerreros de Xico (Serie B)
 Huracanes Izcalli (Serie B)
 Inter Querétaro (Serie A – Group 2)
 Lobos Huerta (Serie B)
 Montañeses (Serie A – Group 2)
 Sporting Canamy (Serie A – Group 2)
 Tecos (Serie A – Group 1)
 Tritones Vallarta (Serie A – Group 1)
 Zap (Serie A – Group 2)

Teams classified at the first place of the 17 groups of the Liga TDP and the top 3 classified in the league coefficient table. 
 Aguacateros de Peribán (Liga TDP – Group 10)
 Alebrijes de Oaxaca (Liga TDP – Group 2)
 Aragón (Liga TDP – Group 4)
 Bombarderos de Tecámac (Liga TDP – Group 8)
 Catedráticos Elite (Liga TDP – Group 13)
 Cimarrones de Sonora (Liga TDP – Group 16)
 Deportiva Venados (Liga TDP – Group 1)
 Diablos Tesistán (Liga TDP – Group 14)
 Estudiantes del Oro (Liga TDP – Group 6)
 Estudiantes de Querétaro (Liga TDP – Group 9)
 Gorilas de Juanacatlán (Liga TDP – Group 12)
 Guerreros DD (Liga TDP – Group 5)
 Juárez (Liga TDP – Group 7)
 London (Liga TDP – Group 17)
 Muxes (Liga TDP – Group 4)
 Poza Rica (Liga TDP – Group 2)
 Saltillo Soccer (Liga TDP – Group 15)
 Titanes de Querétaro (Liga TDP – Group 9)
 Tuzos UAZ (Liga TDP – Group 11)
 Unión (Liga TDP – Group 5)

Bracket
{{#invoke:RoundN|main|columns=5|bold_winner=high|3rdplace=no|team-width=150
|RD1=Round of 32
|RD2=Round of 16
|RD3=Quarter-finals
|RD4=Semi-finals
|RD5=Final

|14 December|Muxes |4|Guerreros de Xico |0
|15 December|Estudiantes del Oro |1 (9)|Huracanes Izcalli  (p.) |
|15 December|Aragón |5|Ciervos |0
|15 December|Unión |1 (2)|Lobos Huerta (p.) |1 (4)
|16 December|Deportiva Venados|1|Poza Rica |0
|16 December|Sporting Canamy |0|Montañeses|1
|16 December|Juárez (p.)|1 (5)|Guerreros DD |1 (4)
|15 December| |1|Alebrijes de Oaxaca |0
|16 December|Saltillo Soccer|5|Tuzos UAZ |4
|16 December|Gavilanes de Matamoros (p.)|1 (5)|Inter Querétaro |1 (4)
|16 December|London |0|Cimarrones de Sonora|2
|15 December|Catedráticos Elite |3 (2)|Diablos Tesistán (p.)|
|16 December| |0 (4)|Titanes de Querétaro |0 (2)
|15 December|||Gorilas de Juanacatlán |1 (4)
|15 December|Zap |3|Colima |1
|16 December|Tecos|3|Tritones Vallarta |2

|26 January|Muxes|2|Huracanes Izcalli| 0
|W/o|Aragón (w)||Lobos Huerta|
|27 January|Deportiva Venados (p.)||Montañeses|
|2 February|Juárez|1||0
|2 February|Saltillo Soccer (p.)||Gavilanes de Matamoros|
|27 January|Cimarrones de Sonora|3|Diablos Tesistán|1
|25 January||0|Aguacateros de Peribán|4
|25 January|Zap |1|Tecos|2

|8 February|Muxes|2|Aragón |1
|10 February|Deportiva Venados|3|Juárez |0
|8 February|Saltillo Soccer|2|Cimarrones de Sonora |1
|8 February|||Tecos |

|23 February|Muxes|2|Deportiva Venados|0
|22 February|Saltillo Soccer|0||2

|10 March|Muxes ||

Matches

Round of 32

|}

Round of 16

|}

Quarter–finals

|}

Semi–finals

|}

Final

|}

See also 
2021–22 Serie A de México season
2021–22 Serie B de México season
2021–22 Liga TDP season

References

External links
 Official website of Copa Conecta

1